Johnson County is the name of several counties in the United States:

Johnson County, Arkansas 
Johnson County, Georgia 
Johnson County, Illinois 
Johnson County, Indiana 
Johnson County, Iowa 
Johnson County, Kansas
Johnson County, Kentucky 
Johnson County, Missouri 
Johnson County, Nebraska 
Johnson County, Tennessee 
Johnson County, Texas 
Johnson County, Wyoming

See also
Johnston County (disambiguation)
Johnson County War, an 1892 range war in Wyoming